Raymond Jack "Ray" Szmanda, Sr. (June 22, 1926 – May 6, 2018) was an American radio and television announcer known throughout the Midwestern United States as the spokesperson for Menards, a position he held for more than two decades.

Early life
Szmanda was born in Milwaukee, Wisconsin and served in the United States Navy during World War II.

Career

Szmanda trained at the American Institute of the Air and took writing courses from the University of Wisconsin–Milwaukee and University of Wisconsin–Madison.

He worked for radio and television stations as a staff announcer from 1951 to 1958, when he began to freelance. From 1959 to 1978, he operated the Trans-American School of Broadcasting in his hometown of Wausau, Wisconsin.

His career with Menards began in 1976, where he was a fixture of the ads until his retirement in 1998. He did, however, make occasional ads with the company starting in 1999. Szmanda appeared in the 1970s science fiction movie The Alpha Incident and hosted the Wausau version of High Quiz Bowl.

Personal life
Szmanda lived in Antigo, Wisconsin. His family included four sons and three daughters. His wife, Maxine, died in 1999, and his son, Ray Jr., died in 2002. His great-nephew Eric Szmanda is an actor, best known as Greg Sanders on CSI.

Death
Szmanda died on May 6, 2018, at age 91, of pneumonia, heart problems and complications from a fall.

References

External links
Ray Szmanda's website
Ray Szmanda profile on Menards.com

1926 births
2018 deaths
Military personnel from Milwaukee
People from Wausau, Wisconsin
People from Antigo, Wisconsin
American male film actors
Amateur radio people
Radio and television announcers
University of Wisconsin–Milwaukee alumni
University of Wisconsin–Madison alumni
United States Navy personnel of World War II